Alejandro Miguel Portal Oliva (born 21 October 1995) is a Cuban professional footballer who plays as a midfielder for the Simcoe County Rovers in League1 Ontario.

Early life
Portal was born in the town of Quivicán, located south of Havana.

Club career
Portal began his career with second-division Torneo de Ascenso side Mayabeque in 2013. In 2015, he moved up to the Campeonato Nacional with Isla de La Juventud, making 27 appearances and scoring four goals over two seasons. In 2017, he joined Cienfuegos, making nineteen appearances over two seasons. He spent 2018 and 2019 with Pinar del Río and La Habana, respectively.

In 2020, he began training with League1 Ontario side Vaughan Azzurri and made his debut as a substitute against Darby on 20 August 2021.

On 9 September 2021, Portal signed his first professional contract with Canadian Premier League side HFX Wanderers. He made his debut on 18 September against York United FC. He departed the club at the end of the season.

In 2022, he returned to playing for Vaughan Azzurri.

In February 2023, he signed with the Simcoe County Rovers in League1 Ontario.

International career
Portal made his debut for the Cuba national team in a 2015 friendly against Nicaragua. He returned to the team four years later for a friendly against Bermuda in 2019. He was later selected for the 2019 CONCACAF Gold Cup squad, where he appeared in all three matches for Cuba.

After Cuba's 6–0 loss to Canada during CONCACAF Nations League qualifying in September, he defected into Canada.

References

External links
 
 

Living people
1995 births
Cuban footballers
Cuba international footballers
Association football midfielders
FC Mayabeque players
FC Isla de La Juventud players
FC Cienfuegos players
FC Pinar del Río players
FC Ciudad de La Habana players
HFX Wanderers FC players
League1 Ontario players
2019 CONCACAF Gold Cup players
2015 CONCACAF U-20 Championship players
People from Quivicán
Cuba under-20 international footballers
Defecting Cuban footballers
Vaughan Azzurri players
Simcoe County Rovers FC players